Season four of Mexico's Next Top Model, the Mexican adaptation of Tyra Banks' America's Next Top Model, aired on Sony Entertainment Television from August to November 2013. Former host Elsa Benítez left the show and was replaced by Jaydy Michel. With the exception of Benítez, all of the judges from the previous season returned for the new season of the show.

The prize package for this season included a US$100,000 modeling contract with Queta Rojas management, a cover feature and an editorial spread in Elle magazine, and a brand new Volkswagen.

The winner of the competition was 18-year-old Paloma Aguilar from Sonora.

Cast

Contestants
(Ages stated are at start of contest)

Judges
 Jaydy Michel (host)
 Allan Fis 
 Antonio González de Cosío
 Glenda Reyna

Other cast members
 Óscar Madrazo - creative director

Episodes

Episode 1
First aired: August 19, 2013
Featured photographer: Alex Córdoba, Gerardo Gudinni

Episode 2
First aired: August 26, 2013
Featured photographer: Óscar Ponce

Episode 3
First aired: September 2, 2013
Featured photographers: Jorge Ruiz, Arturo Díaz

Episode 4
First aired: September 9, 2013
Featured photographer: Gregory Allen

Episode 5
First aired: September 16, 2013
Featured photographer: Jean Berard

Episode 6
First aired: September 23, 2013
Featured photographer: Manolo Sierra

Episode 7
First aired: September 30, 2013
Featured photographer: Emmanuel Campos

Episode 8
First aired: October 7, 2013
Featured photographer: Cecilia Escandón

Episode 9
First aired: October 14, 2013
Featured director: Pitipol Ibarra

Episode 10
First aired: October 21, 2013
Featured photographer: Zony Maya

Episode 11
First aired: October 28, 2013
Featured photographer: Allan Fis

Episode 12
First aired: November 4, 2013
Featured photographer: Santiago Ruiseñor

Results

 The contestant was eliminated
 The contestant quit the competition
 The contestant was eliminated but allowed to remain in the competition
 The contestant won the competition

Notes

References

External links
 Official Website

Mexico's Next Top Model
2013 Mexican television seasons